Cycas segmentifida is a species of cycad endemic to southern China. It is found in primarily western Guangxi, as well as parts of neighboring southern Guizhou and eastern Yunnan.

Range
In China, Cycas segmentifida is recorded in:
Guizhou province: Ceheng County, Guiyang, Wangmo County, and Xingyi
Guangxi province: Nanning and Xilin County
Yunnan province: Funing County
Guangdong province: Guangzhou and Shenzhen cities (introduced)

It is also cultivated in Shenzhen Fairy Lake Botanical Garden, South China Botanical Garden, Guizhou Botanical Garden, and the Forestry Academy of Guangxi.

References

segmentifida
Flora of Guizhou
Flora of Guangxi
Flora of Yunnan